Events from the year 1411 in Ireland.

Incumbent
Lord: Henry IV

Events

Births

Deaths
Murchadh Ó Cuindlis, scribe.

 
1410s in Ireland
Ireland
Years of the 15th century in Ireland